Face TV (previously Triangle Television) is a public service television station based in Auckland, New Zealand. Since August 1998.  It broadcasts on the Sky Network as of December 2013 ASO. Previously, Triangle has broadcast across Auckland on analogue UHF (before December 2013 ASO) via a government-owned UHF channel reserved for non-commercial regional television from transmitters at Waiatarua, Pinehill and Remuera.

The station is a registered charity supported by the Lion Foundation and Foundation North. Airtime is leased out to volunteer and professional programme providers on a first-come, first-served basis. Providers are allowed to air a limited number of commercials (a maximum of 6 minutes per half-hour of broadcast) during their programmes, and have complete editorial control over content. The trust claims these rules mean it "cannot be controlled by individuals or groups with their own agendas".

Triangle also operated Stratos Television between 2007 and 2011. It was broadcast around New Zealand on the Freeview, Sky and TelstraClear cable digital platforms. This was a free-to-air, twenty-four-hour, nationwide news and culture public broadcasting service. It was shut down on 23 December 2011 due to funding complications, because as the channel grew in viewership so did its ratings share and since Freeview carriage charges are ratings based there was a number of increases to fees Triangle as paying to the Kordia operated Freeview service.
As of November 23, 2012 Sky offered Triangle an undisclosed deal to re-launch Stratos under the name Face TV.  The service was launched on February 1, 2013. The service, unlike Stratos, simulcast the current Triangle schedule with national advertising options.  
Using an IP link provided by government-owned Kordia and a government-owned non-commercial UHF channel due to expire in December 2013, Triangle Television also broadcast a similar station across Wellington (operated out of Auckland) from 25 August 2006 to 31 March 2009. The channels shared transmission facilities and resources, and broadcast many of the same news, regional, and cultural programming.

Programming

Special broadcasts

 Election Results Show from RNZ 2017 
 APRA Silver Scroll Awards
 New Zealand vs England test cricket (2008 Sky Sport 1 simulcast)
 Eurovision Song Contest (2009, 2010, 2011)
 Jewel in the Palace (2009)
 Oceania Football Confederation (2009, 2010)
 Midnight Mass from the Vatican (2009)
 Australian Rules Football (2011, 2012)

English language newscasts
Refer to station schedules for broadcast times.

Foreign language newscasts

References

External links
: includes schedules, programme provider links, terms and conditions for programme provision.

Television stations in New Zealand
Mass media in Auckland
Television channels and stations established in 1998
English-language television stations in New Zealand